The Little World of the Past (Italian:Piccolo mondo antico) is an 1895 novel by the Italian writer Antonio Fogazzaro. It was the author's most successful work, considered to be his "masterpiece". Fogazzaro finished the first draft in 1884, and spent the next decade revising it. The novel has an alpine backdrop, and is set in the 1850s during the Risorgimento. Fogazzaro modelled the two protagonists after his parents.

The novel is also known in English under the titles Little Ancient World and The Patriot.

Film adaptation
In 1941, during the Fascist era, the novel was adapted into a film Piccolo mondo antico directed by Mario Soldati and starring Alida Valli and Massimo Serato. The film was extremely popular, and came to be seen as a precursor of neorealism.

References

Bibliography
 Brand, Peter & Pertile, Lino. The Cambridge History of Italian Literature. Cambridge University Press, 1999. 
 Marrone, Gaetana. Encyclopedia of Italian Literary Studies: A-J. Taylor & Francis, 2007.

External links
 The Patriot (Piccolo Mondo Antico) by Antonio Fogazzaro on Project Gutenberg

1895 novels
19th-century Italian novels
Novels set in Italy
Novels by Antonio Fogazzaro
Italian novels adapted into films
Novels set in the 1850s